Aigar Vaigu (born on 6 November 1984) is an Estonian physicist and science propagator.

In 2009, he graduated from University of Tartu.

He has hosted the Eesti Televisioon (ETV) science competition television series Rakett 69.

In 2021, he was awarded with Order of the White Star, V class.

References

1984 births
Living people
21st-century Estonian physicists
Estonian television presenters
University of Tartu alumni
Recipients of the Order of the White Star, 5th Class